Raymond McHale (born 12 August 1950) is an English former professional footballer who played as a central midfielder.

McHale began his career with Chesterfield before moving to Halifax Town. He later played  the Football League for Swindon Town, Brighton & Hove Albion, Barnsley, Sheffield United, Swansea City, Bury, Rochdale and Scarborough. making 599 appearances and scoring 87 goals. He had two spells as manager of Scarborough in the Football League.

* Senior club appearances and goals counted for the domestic league only and correct as of 5 May 2022

References

External links
 
 Ray McHale at Chesterfield-FC.co.uk

1950 births
Living people
Footballers from Sheffield
Association football midfielders
English footballers
Chesterfield F.C. players
Halifax Town A.F.C. players
Swindon Town F.C. players
Brighton & Hove Albion F.C. players
Barnsley F.C. players
Sheffield United F.C. players
Bury F.C. players
Swansea City A.F.C. players
Rochdale A.F.C. players
Scarborough F.C. players
Northwich Victoria F.C. players
English Football League players
English football managers
Scarborough F.C. managers